Order of the Taegeuk was an order of chivalry of the Korean Empire that was given to military or civil officials. It was divided into eight classes. It was part of the establishments of orders on 17 April 1900. From 22 April 1900, order of the taegeuk started to be awarded.

Classes 
Following were the classes and who were the recipients of it:

 1st Class: Ministers who already got 2nd Class and worked well for 5 or more years after getting 2nd Class. After getting 1st class, officials are able to receive Order of the Plum Blossom.
 2nd Class: Officials who already got 3rd Class and worked well for 4 or more years after getting 3rd Class.
 3rd Class: Officials who already got 4th Class and worked well for 4 or more years after getting 4th Class.
 4th Class: Officials who already got 5th Class and worked well for 4 or more years after getting 5th Class.
 5th Class: Officials who already got 6th Class and worked well for 4 or more years after getting 6th Class.
 6th Class: Officials who already got 7th Class and worked well for 3 or more years after getting 7th Class.
 7th Class: Officials who already got 8th Class and worked well for 3 or more years after getting 8th Class.
 8th Class: Officials who worked well for 3 or more years.

Foreigners were able to get these orders but recipients and classes were decided by the government.

Following were how the medals were worn:

1st Class of the order is either Badge (with Daesu) or Medal. Daesu was worn from the right shoulder to the left flank and medal was worn in left breast.

2nd Class of the order is either Badge (with Daesu) or Necklet. Daesu was worn from the right shoulder to the left flank and necklet was worn on neck.

3rd Class was necklet and worn on neck.

4th to 8th class were decorations and was worn in left breast.

Form 
In the middle of the medal, there was a taegeuk, symbol of the Korean Empire, in the middle. The size of the medal varied by classes. Higher classes were bigger. Perimeter of 4th class to 6th class was about 5 cm. Perimeter of 7th to 8th class was about 3 cm. 3rd class to 5th class were made of gold and 6th classes to 8th classes were made of silver.

Trivial 
1st class of Order of the Taegeuk that was presented to Horace Newton Allen became historical property of Korea.

Notable Recipients

1st Class 

 Min Young-hwan on 22 April 1900
 Shim Soon-taek on 4 January 1901

2nd Class 

 Yi Ha-young on 22 April 1900
 Gwon Jae-Hyeong on 22 April 1900
 Min Ung-shik on 22 February 1901
 Shim Sang-hun on 22 February 1901
 Yi Bum-jin on 22 February 1901
 Min Young-chan on 22 February 1901
 Bak Jeongyang on 22 February 1901
 Victor Collin de Plancy on 21 February 1902
 Min Sang-ho on 23 September 1904

3rd Class 

 Jo Byeong-shik on 22 April 1900
 Pak Chesoon on 22 April 1900
 Yi Un-yong on 22 April 1900
 Min Sang-ho on 22 February 1901
 Yi Jae-wan on 22 February 1901

References 

1900 establishments in Korea
Awards established in 1900
Orders of chivalry
Orders, decorations, and medals of the Korean Empire